Count Maurice Frederick of Nassau-Siegen (19 January 1621 – 17 June 1638), official titles: Graf zu Nassau, Katzenelnbogen, Vianden und Diez, Herr zu Beilstein, was a count from the House of Nassau-Siegen, a cadet branch of the Ottonian Line of the House of Nassau. He served as an officer in the Dutch States Army. In the propaganda for the House of Orange, he is regarded as one of the twelve heroes of the House of Nassau who gave their lives in the Eighty Years’ War for the freedom of the Dutch people.

Biography

Maurice Frederick became a student at Leiden University on 3 September 1633, and on 27 May 1636 he was appointed captain of a infantry company in the Dutch States Army, where his father was field marshal.

Prince Frederick Henry of Orange, who intended to lay siege to Antwerp, entrusted Maurice Frederick’s father with an important undertaking in 1638, the occupation of the levee at Calloo. William conquered the sconces of Stabroek and Calloo and chased off the Spaniards, but instead of continuing his march, he reinforced himself on the spot. When he heard the false rumour that the Spaniards were approaching with a greater force than his own, he fled in confusion. On 17 June he suffered a considerable loss of 2,000 men. Maurice Frederick was one of those who fell in this Battle of Calloo. He was buried at Heusden.

Ancestors

Notes

References

Sources
 
 
 
  (1911). "Willem, Wilhelm". In:  en  (redactie), Nieuw Nederlandsch Biografisch Woordenboek (in Dutch). Vol. Eerste deel. Leiden: A.W. Sijthoff. p. 1572.
 
 
 
 
 
 
 
 
 
 
 
 
 
  (1882). Het vorstenhuis Oranje-Nassau. Van de vroegste tijden tot heden (in Dutch). Leiden: A.W. Sijthoff/Utrecht: J.L. Beijers.

External links

 Nassau. In: Medieval Lands. A prosopography of medieval European noble and royal families, compiled by Charles Cawley.
 Nassau Part 5. In: An Online Gotha, by Paul Theroff.

1621 births
1638 deaths
German Calvinist and Reformed Christians
German military officers
German people of the Eighty Years' War
Maurice Frederick
Military personnel of the Eighty Years' War
Military personnel from Siegen
17th-century German military personnel